Allipur is a village and a panchayat located in the Kasganj district of Uttar Pradesh, India.

Demographics
 India census, Allipur had a population of 1200. Males constitute 52% of the population and females 48%. Allipur has an average literacy rate of 55%, lower than the national average of 59.5%; with 60% of the males and 40% of females literate. 20% of the population is under 6 years of age.

References

Villages in Kasganj district